Majške Međe is a settlement in the region of Baranja, Croatia. Administratively, it is located in the Jagodnjak municipality within the Osijek-Baranja County. Population is 82 people.

Name
The name of the village in Croatian or Serbian is plural.

See also
Jagodnjak Municipality
Osijek-Baranja county
Baranja

References

Populated places in Osijek-Baranja County
Baranya (region)
Joint Council of Municipalities
Serb communities in Croatia